Baghan (also Romanized as Bāghān; also known as Bāgheyn and Bāghīn) is a village in Jask Rural District, in the Central District of Jask County, Hormozgan Province, Iran. At the 2006 census, its population was 178, in 29 families.

References 

Populated places in Jask County